La Unión is a canton in the Cartago province of Costa Rica. The head city is in Tres Ríos district.

Toponymy
A story tells of a group of Spanish missionaries from a convent in Guatemala, arriving accompanied by Indians of different cultural groups. The small town they established was called , meaning The Union, to commemorate their friendliness and brotherhood.

History 
La Unión was created on 7 December 1848 by decree 167.

Geography 
La Unión has an area of  km² and a mean elevation of  metres.
La Unión is a compact canton situated midway between the national capital of San José and the former colonial capital city of Cartago.

Districts 
The canton of La Unión is subdivided into the following districts:
 Tres Ríos
 San Diego
 San Juan
 San Rafael
 Concepción
 Dulce Nombre
 San Ramón
 Río Azul

Demographics 

For the 2011 census, La Unión had a population of  inhabitants.

Education
The Lycée Franco Costaricien, a French international school, is in Concepción district.

Transportation

Road transportation 
The canton is covered by the following road routes:

Rail transportation 
The Interurbano Line operated by Incofer goes through this canton.

References

External links
  MI CARTAGO, Cartago Province's local newspaper

Cantons of Cartago Province
Populated places in Cartago Province